Zahn Historic District is a national historic district located at Bedford, Lawrence County, Indiana.  The district encompasses 66 contributing buildings, 1 contributing structure, and 1 contributing object in a predominantly residential section of Bedford.  It developed between about 1847 and 1947, and includes examples of Late Gothic Revival, Second Empire, and Queen Anne style architecture.  Notable buildings include the St. Vincent DePaul Church (1893), Gaussin House (1875), John Zahn House (c. 1865), George Gratzer House (c. 1885), Asa Bridwell House (c. 1925), and Horace Casada House (c. 1925).

It was listed in the National Register of Historic Places in 1998.

References

Historic districts on the National Register of Historic Places in Indiana
Gothic Revival architecture in Indiana
Second Empire architecture in Indiana
Queen Anne architecture in Indiana
Historic districts in Lawrence County, Indiana
National Register of Historic Places in Lawrence County, Indiana